Svetlana Chepelnikova (born 13 March 1979) is a Belarusian speed skater. She competed at the 1998 Winter Olympics and the 2002 Winter Olympics.

References

External links
 

1979 births
Living people
Belarusian female speed skaters
Olympic speed skaters of Belarus
Speed skaters at the 1998 Winter Olympics
Speed skaters at the 2002 Winter Olympics
Sportspeople from Vitebsk